Eupithecia pellicata is a moth in the family Geometridae. It is found in Taiwan.

The wingspan is about 24 mm.

References

Moths described in 2007
pellicata
Moths of Taiwan